Dadin-e Sofla (also Romanized as Dādīn-e Soflá; also known as Dādīn-e Pā’īn and Dīn ol Ḩadar) is a village in Dadin Rural District, Jereh and Baladeh District, Kazerun County, Fars Province, Iran. At the 2006 census, its population was 466, in 95 families.

References 

Populated places in Kazerun County